The Fifth general council may designate, in Catholic history:
The Second Council of Constantinople
Fifth General Council (1512), a council held in 1512 in Rome, at the Pope's Lateran Palace